Cynthia Frisina was recognized by the White House as a Champion of Change for her work in providing opportunities in adaptive sports to girls with disabilities.

References

External links
White House Champions of Change

Year of birth missing (living people)
Living people
American women chief executives
Parasports in the United States